Biblioteca e Archivio del Risorgimento [Library and Archive of the Risorgimento], located in the Historic Center of Florence, houses regional collections relating to the Italian unification and the mid-18th century.

History 
The Library and Archive, owned and operated by the city of Florence, was founded in August 1945 as a restoration and replacement of the Museo del Risorgimento di Firenze founded in 1901.  As of 2020, the Library and Archive's holdings include about 30,000 volumes of heritage documents, 550 volumes of periodicals, two 16th century books, ten current periodicals, one hundred discontinued periodicals, bibliographical funds, manuscripts, and a large iconographic collection from the Risorgimento period.

Collections were seriously damaged by the 1966 flood of the Arno. Nonetheless, the facility and collections were restored and the Library and Archive reopened in 1969.

The Library and Archive is in the same building as:
<li> The Biblioteca comunale centrale di Firenze (it) [Central Municipal Library of Florence]
<li> The Accademia toscana di scienze e lettere La Colombaria (it) [the Tuscan Academy of Sciences and Letters, "La Colombaria"]
<li> The Museo e istituto fiorentino di preistoria (it) [the Florentine Museum and Institute of Prehistory]

In 2007, Italian Senator Paolo Amato (it) (born 1954) during Italy's 15th Legislature (2006–2008), introduced a Bill to restore of the Museum of the Risorgimento in Florence, partly in commemoration the 150 anniversary of the unification of Italy (2011). The Bill states that the Museum had been open to the public only nineteen years, from 1909 though 1938, and was dismantled in 1945, after World War II.

Selected collections 
 Fenzi archives

Access by public transit 
 ATAF – Azienda Trasporti dell'Area Fiorentina (: Florentine Area Transport Company) (it)
 Bus 23: Santa Maria Nuova stop (on Via Maurizio Bufalini (it) / Via Sant'Egidio (it), between Via della Pergola and Via del Castellaccio)
 Bus 14B: Colonna Pergola stop (on Via della Colonna (it), between Via dei Fibbiai (it) and Via della Pergola)

Nearby points of interest 
 Palazzo Pucci
 Hospital of Santa Maria Nuova
 The church of Sant'Egidio (it) (Community of Sant'Egidio)
 Teatro della Pergola
 Palazzo Galletti (it), via Sant'Egidio 12
 Complesso delle Oblate (it) (Oblate Complex) – former monastery dating back to 1288, now, as of 2007, the municipally owned and operated Oblate library, a state-of-the-art multifunctional center.
 Palazzo Bastogi (it)

See also 
 1966 flood of the Arno

Other libraries and archives in the Florence area 
 Biblioteca Marucelliana
 Biblioteca Riccardiana
 Biblioteca dell'Accademia di Belle Arti
 Istituto Geografico Militare [Military Geographic Institute]
 Laurentian Library
 Library at the British Institute of Florence
 Library and Archives at the Accademia dei Georgofili
 Library at the Kunsthistorisches Institut in Florenz
 Library of the Gabinetto Vieusseux
 Library at the Villa I Tatti, Harvard University
 National Central Library

More comprehensive list (in Italian) 
 Biblioteche di Firenze (it)

Bibliography

Notes

References to linked inline notes 

 
  . .
 . .

 . .

 

    (publication).  (article).

General references (not linked to notes)

  (journal).  (journal).
 "InventarioI". Vol. 11, no. 2 (July–December 1965). pp. 301–333.
 "InventarioII". Vol. 12, no. 1 (January–June 1966). pp. 113–186. Cronaca 147.
 "InventarioIII". Vol. 12, no. 2 (July–December 1966). pp. 233–291. Cronaca 293.
 "Inventario IV". Vol. 20, no. 1 (January–June 1974). pp. 109–138. Le caricature 109. OPAC SBN Codice Identificativo  (article)

1945 establishments in Italy
Libraries in Florence
Archives in Italy
Culture in Florence
Research libraries
Genealogical libraries
History of Florence
Libraries established in 1945
Museums of the Italian unification